The 2015–16 FA Trophy was the 46th season of the FA Trophy, the Football Association's cup competition for teams at levels 5–8 of the English football league system. A total of 276 clubs entered the competition, which was won by FC Halifax Town after beating Grimsby Town 1-0 in front of 46,781 spectators at Wembley in the final on 22 May 2016.

Calendar

Preliminary round
A total of 128 clubs, from Level 8 of English football, entered preliminary round of the competition. Eight clubs from level 8 get a bye to the first round qualifying - AFC Hornchurch, Bedford Town, Brighouse Town, Chatham Town, Goole, Kings Langley, Peacehaven & Telscombe and Swindon Supermarine.

First round qualifying
First round qualifying fixtures were due to be played on 31 October 2015, with replays taking place no later than 6 November. A total of 144 teams took part in this stage of the competition including 64 winners from the preliminary round, 72 teams from Level 7 of English football and eight teams from level 8, who get a bye in the previous round.

Second round qualifying
Second round qualifying fixtures were due to be played on 14 November 2015, with replays taking place no later than 20 November. A total of 72 teams took part in this stage of the competition, all winners from the first qualifying round. The draw was as follows:

Third round qualifying
Third round qualifying fixtures were due to be played on 28 November 2015, with replays taking place no later than 4 December. A total of 80 teams took part in this stage of the competition, all winners from the second round qualifying and 44 clubs from Level 6 of English football. The draw was as follows:

First round
First round fixtures were due to be played on 12 December 2015, with replays taking place no later than 18 December. A total of 64 teams took part in this stage of the competition, all winners from the third round qualifying and the clubs from Level 5 of English football. The draw was as follows:

Second round
Second round fixtures were due to be played on 16 January 2016, with replays taking place no later than 22 January. A total of 32 teams took part in this stage of the competition, all winners from the first round. The draw was as follows:

Third round
Third round fixtures were due to be played on 6 February 2016, with replays taking place no later than 12 February. A total of 16 teams took part in this stage of the competition, all winners from the second round. The draw was as follows:

Fourth round
Fourth round fixtures were due to be played on 27 February 2016, with replays taking place no later than 4 March. A total of 8 teams took part in this stage of the competition, all winners from the third round. The draw was as follows:

Semi-finals
Semi-final fixtures were due to be played on 12 March and 19 March 2016, with the second leg going to extra time and penalties if required. A total of four teams took part in this stage of the competition. The draw was as follows:

First leg

Second leg

Final

References

FA Trophy seasons
England
trophy